Ashin-e Sofla (also Romanized as Āshīn-e Soflá; also known as Āshīn, Āshīn-e Pā’īn, and Āshīn Pā’īn) is a village in Soghan Rural District, Soghan District, Arzuiyeh County, Kerman Province, Iran. At the 2006 census, its population was 146, distributed between 31 families.

References 

Populated places in Arzuiyeh County